Basilicum is a genus of plants in the family Lamiaceae, first described in 1802. It contains only one known species, Basilicum polystachyon, native to Africa, Madagascar, southern Asia (Saudi Arabia, India, China, Indochina, Borneo, Philippines, etc.), New Guinea, Australia, and various islands of the Pacific and Indian Oceans.

References

Lamiaceae
Monotypic Lamiaceae genera
Flora of Africa
Flora of Asia
Flora of Australia
Flora of New Guinea